The El Peñón Formation (Kipe) is a geological formation of the Altiplano Cundiboyacense, Eastern Ranges of the Colombian Andes. Ammonite fossils have been found in the formation, deposited in a shallow marine platform environment.

Etymology 
The formation was defined and named in 1982 by Ulloa after El Peñón, Cundinamarca.

Description

Lithologies 
The middle part of the sequence contains gypsum. Fossils of the ammonites Cheloniceras sp. and Epicheloniceras sp. aff. carlosacostai have been found in the El Peñón Formation.

Stratigraphy and depositional environment 
The El Peñón Formation, part of the Villeta Group, conformably overlies the Trincheras Formation and is conformably overlain by the Capotes Formation. The age has been estimated to be Late Aptian. Stratigraphically, the formation is time equivalent with the Tablazo Formation and a lateral facies equivalent of the Socotá Formation. The formation has been deposited in a shallow marine platform environment. In the Late Aptian, central Colombia was dominated by shallow marine carbonate platform environments.

Outcrops 

The El Peñón Formation, restricted to Cundinamarca, is locally found around its type locality, between Bituima and Guayabal de Síquima, and along the road from Villeta to Sasaima.

Regional correlations

See also 

 Geology of the Eastern Hills
 Geology of the Ocetá Páramo
 Geology of the Altiplano Cundiboyacense

References

Bibliography

Maps

External links 
 

Geologic formations of Colombia
Cretaceous Colombia
Lower Cretaceous Series of South America
Aptian Stage
Shale formations
Shallow marine deposits
Formations
Formations